is a prefecture of Japan located in the Tōhoku region of Honshu. Its population is approximately 966,000 (as of 1 October 2019) and its geographic area is 11,637 km2 (4,493 sq mi). Akita Prefecture is bordered by Aomori Prefecture to the north, Iwate Prefecture to the east, Miyagi Prefecture to the southeast, and Yamagata Prefecture to the south.

Akita is the capital and largest city of Akita Prefecture.  Other major cities include Yokote, Daisen, and Yurihonjō. Akita Prefecture is located on the coast of the Sea of Japan and extends east to the Ōu Mountains, the longest mountain range in Japan, at the border with Iwate Prefecture. Akita Prefecture formed the northern half of the historic Dewa Province with Yamagata Prefecture.

History 

The region of Akita was created from the ancient provinces of Dewa and Mutsu.

Separated from the principal Japanese centres of commerce, politics, and population by several hundred kilometres and by the Ōu and Dewa mountain ranges to the east, Akita remained largely isolated from Japanese society until after the year 600. Akita was a region of hunter-gatherers and principally nomadic tribes.

The first historical record of what is now Akita Prefecture dates to 658, when Abe no Hirafu conquered the native Ezo tribes at what are now the cities of Akita and Noshiro. Abe, then governor of Koshi Province (the northwestern part of Honshū bordering the Sea of Japan), established a fort on the Mogami River, and thus began the Japanese settlement of the region.

In 733, a new military settlement (later renamed Akita Castle) was built in what is now the Takashimizu area of Akita, and more permanent roads and structures were developed. The region was used as a base of operations for the Japanese empire as it drove the native Ezo people from northern Honshū.

Governance of the region shifted hands several times. During the Tokugawa shogunate it was appropriated to the Satake clan, who ruled the region for 260 years and developed the agriculture and mining industries that are still predominant today. Throughout this period, it was classified as part of Dewa Province. In 1871, during the Meiji Restoration, Dewa Province was reshaped and the old daimyō domains were abolished and administratively reconstructed, resulting in the modern-day borders of Akita.

The famous Heian period waka poet, Ono no Komachi, is said to have been born in Yuzawa City, Ogachi Town, located in the southeast of the prefecture.

Geography 

Located on the north-western side of Honshu, Akita Prefecture is adjacent to the Sea of Japan to the west and borders four other prefectures: Aomori in the north, Iwate in the east, Miyagi in the southeast, and Yamagata in the south.

The borders of Akita Prefecture roughly form a rectangle that is 169 kilometres (105 miles) from north to south and 86 kilometres (54 miles) from west to east. The Oga Peninsula is a prominent feature of the western edge, while the Ōu Mountains mark the eastern border and the higher Dewa Mountains run parallel through the center. Like much of northern Japan, the prefecture has cold winters, particularly in areas farther from the sea.

As of 31 March 2019, 11% of the total land area of the prefecture is designated as Natural Parks, namely the Towada-Hachimantai National Park; Chōkai, Kurikoma, and Oga Quasi-National Parks; and Akita Shirakami, Hachimori Iwadate, Kimimachizaka, Magi Mahiru, Moriyoshizan, Taiheizan, Tashirodake, and Tazawako Dakigaeri Prefectural Natural Parks.

Cities

Thirteen cities are located in Akita Prefecture:

Towns and villages
These are the towns and villages in each district:

Mergers

List of governors of Akita Prefecture (from 1947)

Economy and population 

Like much of the Tōhoku Region, Akita's economy remains dominated by traditional industries such as agriculture, fishing, and forestry. This has led many young people to migrate to Tokyo and other large cities. Akita Prefecture has seen some of the most severe population decline in Japan: it is one of four prefectures in Japan registering declines in population since 1955. Its population also has the lowest percentage of children, at 11.2%. As of October 1, 2019, it has a population of approximately 966,000 people.

The high rate of depopulation in Akita Prefecture has led smaller communities to merge with each other, which has affected the smallest of these merged communities. As depopulation in these communities continues, educational and health facilities have closed in some areas, encouraging families to migrate to larger cities for better access to health and educational opportunities and perpetuating the decline in population. This decline, combined with an aging population, has been concerning for rural communities.

Culture
Akita, 秋田, meaning autumn rice paddy, is famous for rice farming and its sake breweries. It is well known for having the highest consumption of sake in Japan and is thought to be the origin of the Akita breed of dog which carries the prefecture's name. Ono no Komachi is a famous example of an Akita bijin.

Food 
Akita is known for the following regional specialties (tokusanhin):

 Kiritanpo Nabe
 Gakko
 Rice – Akita komachi
 Sake

Sports 

 Akita Northern Happinets, men's basketball team.
 Akita Bank Red Arrows, women's basketball team.
 Prestige International Aranmare Akita, women's basketball team.
 Akita Northern Bullets, rugby union team.
 Blaublitz Akita, association football team.

Tourism

Recently there have been efforts to revitalize rural communities facing depopulation with different forms of green tourism and agritourism. These efforts are primarily aimed at attracting urbanites and foreign tourists to Akita Prefecture, advertising its pristine forests, sprawling rice fields, and range of cultures.  There has been a push for home stays, farmers markets for locally produced foods, and the integration of outsiders into local cultural practices.  The Namahage ritual in Oga on New Year's Eve draws a large number of tourists to Akita Prefecture every year.

Near Lake Tazawa, there are a number of hot springs resorts (onsen). These are popular with tourists from all over Japan.  In addition, numerous seasonal festivals (matsuri) offer a glimpse of rural or traditional Japan. Some famous examples are the Akita Kantō, the Omagari Fireworks, Namahage Festival, and the Yokote Kamakura Festivals.

Kakunodate, known as the little Kyoto, features many preserved samurai houses. The Aoyagi house is the former residence of Odano Naotake,  who illustrated Japan's first modern guide to human anatomy.  The house is now a museum and gallery of medical illustrations and traditional crafts.

Starting in 2009, Akita began experiencing a huge surge in Korean tourism after the airing of the popular drama Iris, which featured several scenes shot in Akita, most notably at Lake Tazawa and Oga's GAO Aquarium.

Famous festival and events

 Kariwano Big Tug Festival, Daisen (February)
 Amekko Festival, Odate (February)
 Kamakura Snow Statue Event, Yokote (February)
 Tsuchizaki Shinmei Festival, Akita (July)
Akita Kanto Festival, Akita (August)
 Nishimonai Bon Dancing Festival, Ugo (August)
 Kemanai Bon Dancing Festival, Daisen (August)
 All Japan Firework Competition, Daisen (August)
 Kakunodate Festival, Semboku (September)

Transportation

Railroads

 JR East
 Akita Shinkansen
 Gono Line
 Hanawa Line
 Kitakami Line
 Ōu Main Line
 Uetsu Main Line
 Oga Line
 Tazawako Line
 Akita Trans Inland Railway (Akita Nairiku Jyukan Railway)
 Akita Nairiku Line
 Yuri Plateau Railway (Yuri Kogen Railway)

Roads

Expressways

 Akita Expressway
 Nihonkai-Tohoku Expressway
 Tohoku Expressway
 Yuzawa-Yokote Road

National highways

 Route 7 (-Nikaho-Yurihonjō-Akita-Katagami-Ikawa-Gojōme-Hachirōgata-Mitane-Noshiro-Kitaakita-Ōdate-)
 Route 13 (-Yuzawa-Yokote-Misato-Daisen-Akita)
 Route 46 (-Semboku-Daisen-Akita)
 Route 101 (-Happō-Noshiro-Mitane-Oga-Katagami-Akita)
 Route 103 (-Kosaka-Kazuno-Ōdate)
 Route 104 (-Kazuno-Ōdate)
 Route 105 (Yurihonjō-Daisen-Semboku-Kitaakita)
 Route 107 (-Yokote-Yurihonjō)
 Route 108 (-Yuzawa-Yurihonjō)
 Route 282 (-Kazuno-Kosaka-)
 Route 341 (Kazuno-Semboku-Daisen-Akita-Yurihonjō)
 Route 342 (Yokote-Higashinaruse-)
 Route 397 (-Higashinaruse-Yokote)
 Route 398 (-Yuzawa-Ugo-Yurihonjō)
 Route 454 (-Kazuno-Towada, Aomori-Kosaka-)

Airports
 Akita Airport
 Odate-Noshiro Airport

Education

Universities in Akita Prefecture

 Akita International University
 Akita Prefectural University
 Akita University
 Akita University of Nursing and Welfare
 North Asia University

Media

Television 
 NHK Akita Broadcasting (NHK)
 Akita Asahi Broadcasting (AAB)
 Akita Broadcasting System (ABS)
 Akita Television (AKT)

Notes

References

 Nussbaum, Louis-Frédéric and Käthe Roth. (2005).  Japan encyclopedia. Cambridge: Harvard University Press. ; OCLC 58053128

External links 

Akita Prefecture Official Website

 
Tōhoku region
Prefectures of Japan